Gomphaeschna is a genus of pygmy darners in the dragonfly family Aeshnidae. There are about nine described species in Gomphaeschna.

Species
These nine species belong to the genus Gomphaeschna:
 Gomphaeschna antilope (Hagen, 1874) (taper-tailed darner)
 Gomphaeschna carinthiae Schädel & Lechner, 2017
 Gomphaeschna furcillata (Say, 1840) (harlequin darner)
 † Gomphaeschna danica Madsen & Nel, 1997
 † Gomphaeschna inferna Pritykina, 1977
 † Gomphaeschna miocenica Prokop & Nel, 2002
 † Gomphaeschna paleocenica Madsen & Nel, 1997
 † Gomphaeschna schrankii Lewis, 1988
 † Gomphaeschna sibirica Bechly & al., 2001

References

Further reading

External links

 

Aeshnidae
Articles created by Qbugbot